Evaniella semaeoda is a species of ensign wasp in the family Evaniidae. It is found in the Caribbean Sea and North America.

References

Further reading

 

Evanioidea
Articles created by Qbugbot
Insects described in 1908